The Arkansas Black is an apple cultivar that originated in the mid-19th Century in Benton County, Arkansas. It is not the same as the cultivar 'Arkansas' or 'Arkansas Black Twig'.

Arkansas Black apples are generally medium-sized with a somewhat flattened shape.  Generally a very dark red on the tree, occasionally with a slight green blush where hidden from the sun, the apples grow darker as they ripen, becoming a very dark red or burgundy color. With storage the skin continues to darken. Arkansas Black is one of the darkest of all apple cultivars, hence the name.

The flesh in good years is notably hard and crunchy when fresh, though it does soften somewhat with keeping.  Fairly tart when fresh-picked, the apples mellow with storage.  Arkansas Blacks are considered an excellent keeping apple, and can be stored for six months in appropriate conditions.

Though the cultivar is grown throughout the United States, it is said that the best apples come from western Arkansas where the cultivar originated.  Popular as a fresh picked apple at roadside stands and produce markets, the apple has begun to enter commercial distribution and so is now becoming more widely available.

References

External links
 Arkansas Black apple - description, flavour, origins and discussion of this apple variety
 Apple Journal--Variety Notes (page 1)
 Encyclopedia of Arkansas
 Arkansas Apple History

American apples
Apple cultivars